Suheil Kiwan (Arabic:سهيل كيوان) is a Palestinian journalist and novelist. He won the Tawfiq Zayyad Institution Award in 2002 for his critical study titled ‘Ghassan Kanafani: Al-Jamal Al-Hazeen wa Al-‘Ata’ Al-Mutawahij'.

Early life 
He was born in Majd al-Krum in the Western Galilee in 1956. He studied primary school in his village, and continued his secondary studies in the Agricultural High School. He studied Philosophy for a year in Eastern Berlin. He worked as a literary editor in Al-Arabi magazine, which issues from Nazareth, from 1998 till 2014. In 1983, he started working in Al-Jadid magazine, which issues from Haifa, and in Al-Ittihad newspaper. He also writes for Al-Quds Al-Arabi newspaper, which is issued in London, and Arab 48 website.
He published novels, story collections, children's stories, and plays. He works with the Academy of the Arabic Language and Al-Salla Al-Thaqafiya program which host him as a writer, where he meets students. He won the Tawfiq Zayyad Institution Award in 2002 for a critical study titled ‘Ghassan Kanafani: Al-Jamal AL-Hazeen wa Al-‘Ata’ Al-Mutawahij’ in Ghassan Kanafani's literature.

Works

Novels 

 Asi Al-Dam’, 1997, Dar Al-Aswar, Acre, Palestine
 Maqtal Al-Tha’er Al-Akheer, 1998, Dar Al-Aswar, Acre, Palestine
 Al-Mafqood Raqam 2000, Dar Al-Aswar, Acre, Palestine
 Balad Al-Manhoos, 2018, Kul Shee Library, Haifa, Palestine

Studies 

 Homeros min Al-Sahra’: Dirasat fi Shi’r Samih al-Qasim, (co-operative work), 2000
 Ghassan Kanafani: Al-Jamal AL-Hazeen wa Al-‘Ata’ Al-Mutawahij, 2002, Palestinian Organisation for National Guidance

Plays 

 El-Ardh Bet’thel Tdor, (performed in Al-Risala Theatre in Majd Al-Krum), (not published), 1982
 Sitta ‘Ala Sitta, a satirical play which won an award of recognition from Al-Midan Theater in Haifa
 Awraq Fat’hiya Al-A’far, (a play in vernacular), published in acts in Kul Al-Arab newspaper in 2004
 Ma’a Fa’eq Al-Ihtiram, Al-Karma Theater, directed by Nabil Azir
 Mamlakat Al-Maraya, first edition published in 2008, followed by multiple reprints, illustrated by Anna Forlati, Dar Al-Aswar, Acre, Palestine. The play was performed in Beit Al-Karama in Haifa, Palestine

Children's stories 

 Al-Qird Al-Shareh, first edition published in 1995, illustrated by Irina Karkabi, Children's literature Center
 Al-Asafeer Al-Tayiba, 1998, illustrated by Juhaina Habibi Qandilfit, Children's literature Center, Haifa, Palestine
 Kharboosha wa Awladuha, 2005, Elizabeth Mahameed, Children's literature Center, Nazareth, Palestine
 Zafaf Haleeb wa Shokolata, 2012, illustrated by Vita Tenniel, Dar Al-Huda
 Aghla min Al-Thahab bi Katheer, 2013, illustrated by Nawar Abu Khidra Rashid, Al-Kitab wa Al-Maktabat Centre in Palestine, Arabic Children's Literature
 ‘Ilbat Halawa, illustrated by Manar N’eerat, 2015, Dar Al-Aswar, Acre, Palestine
 Fi Qaryatina Intikhabat, 2016, Dar Al-Aswar, Acre, Palestine
 Mamlakat Al-Maraya, first edition published in 2008, followed by multiple reprints, illustrated by Anna Forlati, Dar Al-Aswar, Acre, Palestine. The play was performed in Beit Al-Karama in Haifa, Palestine

Story collections 

 Al-Mubaraza, 1991, Dar Al-Aswar, Acre, Palestine
 Ahzan Al-Nakheel, 1993
 That Sat’h Al-Hibr, 2005, Dar Al-Majid, Ram’Allah
 Madih Likhazooq ‘Akhar, 2013, Dar Al-Raya, Haifa
 Masra’ Hatem Tai, 2018, Kul Shee Library, Haifa

Awards 

 Tawfiq Zayyad Institution Award in 2001 for a critical study titled ‘Ghassan Kanafani: Al-Jamal AL-Hazeen wa Al-‘Ata’ Al-Mutawahij’ in Ghassan Kanafani's literature
 Award of recognition from Al-Midan Theater in Haifa for his play Sitta ala Sitta
 National Award from Anna Lindh Foundation for children's literature for his play Mamlakat Al-Maraya, which was produced by Qasim Sha’ban, and published by Dar Al-Aswar lil Tifl, Acre

References 

Palestinian novelists
Palestinian journalists
1956 births
Living people